Alexander Kaletski is an American contemporary artist. Kaletski became famous with Cardboard paintings he created by using cardboard boxes he finds on the streets of New York. He works in the varieties of medias and styles. Kaletski makes oil paintings, collages, sculptures and videos.

Life 
Born in Soviet Russia, Kaletski studied acting in Moscow from 1965 to 1969 and went on to a highly successful career on stage, television, and film productions. At the same time he held underground art shows and performed songs of protest. In 1975, fleeing political prosecution and the threat of arrest by the KGB, artist and author Kaletski left the USSR. He went first to Vienna for a week, then to Rome for a month, and finally New York where he initially lived in a welfare hotel, then a room in Queens and finally an East Side studio he still uses today. When he came to America, Kaletski gave a nationwide concert tour of his Moscow underground songs, eventually appearing on the Merv Griffin television show. He taught Russian, designed fashion fabrics, illustrated books. In 1985 he published semi-autobiographical novel "Metro: A Novel of the Russian Underground" (Viking) which became an international bestseller. This year Kaletski has finished two novels - Darkness of Light and Bible Thief.

Career 
Kaletski's first love was always painting. As a child he won several art competitions. At the time, in Soviet Russia only officially designated artists were allowed to legally sell their work, which was forbidden to be abstract, surreal or critical of Soviet life. Kaletski refused to paint in a style of socialist realism. But he painted anyway and went underground, where he found a thriving culture that provided him with an audience for his art and songs. In the Moscow underground Kaletski was working on the series of watercolors which he was selling to the foreigners on the black market.

When he left the USSR, Kaletski carried with him these watercolors. During that time in the Soviet Union, the works of unsanctioned or "non conformist" painters were forbidden and exhibiting as an outsider was considered a serious crime.  Forgoing other necessary belongings, the artist had to pay for the release of his own pieces. When Kaletski arrived in America his watercolors were immediately exhibited in many universities around the United States, constituting some of the earliest non-conformist art to be viewed in America.  His works surprised audiences as they showed unexpectedly that behind the Iron Curtain existed not only gloom and sadness, but also humor, beauty and hope.

During his first years in America, as an artist without money to buy paint or canvas, Kaletski was drawn by his natural talent for improvisation to the thousands of cardboard boxes that litter the streets of the Big Apple. Kaletski became enthralled with the high quality of disposable packing materials in the USA. For the artist, those boxes provided unique, if unusual, components for the creative process. Beginning with commercial cardboard packaging he collaged the material adding line and color. The resulting artwork reveals, informs, provokes, but most often, amuses the viewer.

Kaletski was the inaugural exhibition for Dillon Gallery when it opened in Soho in 1994. In the last seventeen years the gallery has presented numerous exhibitions of the artist's works, the most acclaimed being his Cardboard People exhibition, which opened in 1996. The show became an instant success. Since then Kaletski has regularly exhibited his paintings in museum exhibitions in the US and abroad (Austria, England, the Netherlands, Switzerland, Russia, and Japan) presenting to the audience a variety of styles, techniques and concepts.

Exhibitions

Solo exhibitions  
 2023 - "Alexander Kaletski - Box-Cutter" - Anna Zorina Gallery, Los Angeles, California
 2021 - "Ricochet" - Anna Zorina Gallery, New York City
 2021 - "La Vie En Blue" - De Jalon Fine Arts, Mexico City, Mexico
 2019 - "Lacey Lives" - Anna Zorina Gallery, New York City
 2018 - "Breaking The Wall" - B-Monster, Shanghai, China
 2017 - "This Side Up" - Anna Zorina Gallery, New York City
 2016 - "Musas De Carton" - De Jalon Fine Arts, Mexico City, Mexico
 2016 - "Out of the Blue" - Anna Zorina Gallery, New York City
 2015 - "Inspirations" - (Le) Poisson Rouge, New York City
 2014 - "Red Carpet" - Anna Zorina Gallery,  New York City
 2014 - "Red Carpet" - Mary Boone Gallery,  New York City
 2013 - "Handle with Care" - Anna Zorina Gallery,  New York City
 2012 - "Cardboard Cafe" - Dillon Gallery,  New York City
 2012 - "Beach Shack" - Art Southampton, Southampton, New York
 2012 - "Cardboard People Around the World" - MAD, Saint Gervais, France
 2012 - "Designer's Trash" - Bonbright Gallery, Los Angeles, California
 2012 - "Cardboard People Around the World" - Valette Foundation, Martigny, Switzerland
 2011 - "Contemplation" - Dillon Gallery, New York City 
 2011 - "Cardboard People Around the World" - Looshaus, Raiffeisen Bank, Vienna, Austria 
 2010 - "Carton of Eden" - Dillon Gallery, New York City
 2010 - "From New York to Tokyo" - Kato Gallery, Tokyo, Japan
 2008 - "Wet Dreams" - Dillon Gallery, New York City 
 2008 - "Cardboard People" - Lasandr-art Gallery, Minsk, Belarus
 2007 - "Cardboard Castle" - Dillon Gallery, New York City
 2007 - "Familiar Strangers" - Nelson Macker Gallery, Port Chester, Connecticut
 2005 - "White Rain" - Spike Gallery, New York City 
 2003 - "Headlines" - Dillon Gallery, Oyster Bay, New York
 2003 - "American Breakfast" - Gomez Gallery, Baltimore, Maryland
 2002 - "Cardboard Museum" - Nassau County Museum of Art, Roslyn Harbor, New York
 2002 - "Out of the Box" - Dillon Gallery, Oyster Bay, New York
 2002 - "Cardboard Box" - The Aldrich Contemporary Art Museum, Ridgefield, Connecticut
 2000 - "Art and Wine" - The Hague, The Netherlands
 2000 - "Women Only" - Dillon Gallery, New York City
 1999 - "Paper Heroes" - The Museum of Contemporary Art, Minsk, Belarus
 1998 - "Wallpaper Heroes" - Dillon Gallery, New York City
 1997 - "Nude Colony" - Dillon Gallery, New York City
 1996 - "Cardboard People" - Dillon Gallery, New York City
 1996 - "Split Personality" - Gwenda Jay Gallery, Chicago, Illinois
 1995 - "Dead Ancestors" - Dillon Gallery, New York City
 1994 - "Dreams of a Window Cleaner" - Dillon Gallery, New York City
 1993 - "People in Boxes" - Z Gallery, New York City
 1989 - "Rectangles" - Andre Zarre Gallery, New York City
 1987 - "Angular People" - Schiller-Wapner Gallery, New York City
 1977 - Princeton University, Princeton, New Jersey
 1976 - Indiana University, Bloomington]], Indiana
 1976 - Columbia University, New York City]]
 1975 - Saratoga Art Center, Saratoga, New York

1946 births
Living people
American artists
American people of Russian descent
Soviet emigrants to the United States